Nick DiDia is an American record producer, engineer and mixer currently residing in Australia. He has lived and worked in Los Angeles and later Atlanta before moving to Byron Bay, Australia. Since the early 1990s, he has amassed over 40 million in sales with a variety of artists, including Bruce Springsteen, Rage Against the Machine, Pearl Jam, and Powderfinger.

Selected discography

Aldo Nova – Blood on the Bricks
Alice Cooper – Trash
Anti-Flag – The Terror State
Audioslave – Revelations
Augustana – All the Stars and Boulevards
Ben Folds Five – The Unauthorized Biography of Reinhold Messner
Billy Falcon – Pretty Blue World
Billy Talent – Billy Talent III
Brad – Interiors
Brand New Immortals – Tragic Show
The Bravery – The Sun and the Moon
Bruce Springsteen – The Rising
Bruce Springsteen – Live in Barcelona
Bruce Springsteen – Devils & Dust
Bruce Springsteen – Magic
Bruce Springsteen – Working on a Dream
Bruce Springsteen – High Hopes
The Cairos – Dream of Reason
Caroline's Spine – Monsoon
Caroline's Spine – Attention Please
Cinderella – Night Songs
The Crash Motive – Just Cause It Never Happened Don't Mean It Won't
Curtis Stigers – Curtis Stigers
Dan Baird – Love Songs for the Hearing Impaired
Dan Baird – Buffalo Nickel
Danzig – Danzig III: How the Gods Kill
Danzig – The Lost Tracks of Danzig
Devilhead – Pest Control
El Pus – Hoodlum Rock Vol. 1
The Gaslight Anthem – Handwritten
Glenn Danzig – Black Aria
God Street Wine – $1.99 Romances
Gorky Park – Gorky Park
Green Apple Quick Step – Reloaded
The Honeydogs – Seen a Ghost
Incubus – A Crow Left of the Murder...
Incubus – Alive at Red Rocks
Incubus – Light Grenades
Jackyl – Jackyl
Jimmy Barnes – 30:30 Hindsight
Jonny Polonsky – The Power of Sound
Karnivool – Asymmetry
Kasey Chambers – Bittersweet
Katie Noonan and the Captains – Emperor's Box
Killswitch Engage – Killswitch Engage
King's X – Dogman
Korn – Issues
The Living End – The Ending Is Just the Beginning Repeating
Local H – Pack Up the Cats
Local H – Half-Life E.P.
Local H – Here Comes the Zoo
Malfunkshun – Return to Olympus
Martin Sexton – Wonder Bar
Mastodon – Crack the Skye
Mastodon – Live at the Aragon
Matthew Sweet – 100% Fun
Matthew Sweet – Blue Sky on Mars
Michael Penn – Resigned
Michael Penn – MP4: Days Since a Lost Time Accident
Michelle Malone – Sugarfoot
Michelle Malone – Debris
The Music – Welcome to the North
Neil Young – Mirror Ball
The Nightwatchman – One Man Revolution
Nine Days – The Madding Crowd
The Offspring – Conspiracy of One
The Offspring – Splinter
Orange 9mm – Driver Not Included
Papa Roach – Lovehatetragedy
Patty Smyth – Patty Smyth
Paul Westerberg – Eventually
Pearl Jam – Vs.
Pearl Jam – Vitalogy
Pearl Jam – No Code
Pearl Jam – Yield
Pearl Jam – Backspacer
Pearl Jam – Lightning Bolt
Powderfinger – Internationalist
Powderfinger – Odyssey Number Five
Powderfinger – Vulture Street
Powderfinger – Fingerprints: The Best of Powderfinger, 1994–2000
Powderfinger – Golden Rule
Rage Against the Machine – Evil Empire
Rage Against the Machine – "The Ghost of Tom Joad"
Rage Against the Machine – The Battle of Los Angeles
Raging Slab – Dynamite Monster Boogie Concert
Russell Morris – Black and Blue Heart
Rose Hill Drive – Rose Hill Drive
Sass Jordan – Rats
Satchel – The Family
Shaver – Unshaven: Live at Smith's Olde Bar
Shawn Smith – Let It All Begin
sleepmakeswaves – Love of Cartography
Soulhat – Good to Be Gone
Stone Temple Pilots – Core
Stone Temple Pilots – Purple
Stone Temple Pilots – Tiny Music... Songs from the Vatican Gift Shop
Stone Temple Pilots – No. 4
Stone Temple Pilots – Shangri-La Dee Da
Stone Temple Pilots – Thank You
Sun-60 – Headjoy
Third Day – Come Together
The Thorns – The Thorns
Train – Drops of Jupiter
Train – My Private Nation
Train – For Me, It's You
Trial Kennedy – New Manic Art
Velvet Revolver – Libertad
Von Grey – Von Grey
Waax – Big Grief
Walk the Moon – Walk the Moon
The Wallflowers – Rebel, Sweetheart

Awards
Grammy Award for Best Rock Album 2002 The Rising (Bruce Springsteen)
ARIA Award for Album of the Year 1999/2001/2003/2011
ARIA Award for Best Rock Album 1999/2001/2003/2011
ARIA Award for Best Hard Rock or Heavy Metal Album 2013

References

External links
 

Living people
Record producers from New Jersey
Australian record producers
Musicians from Edison, New Jersey
Year of birth missing (living people)